Giannis Voglis (30 September 1937 – 20 April 2016) was a Greek actor.

Biography
Voglis was born in Athens and he studied at Pelos Katselis'  drama academy.  His father was from Asia Minor and his mother from Andros. His first appearance in the theater was in the theatrical performance I anodos tou Artouro in 1961, directed by Karolos Koun. He made his first appearance in film in the movie I Iperifani. He became famous during the movie Koritsia ston ilio (Girls In The Sun) in 1968. His most important role was in the movie To homa vaftike kokkino (The Soil Got Painted Red) by Vassilis Georgiadis.

Voglis appeared mainly in theatre along with other famous actors and actresses including Elli Lambeti, Alekos Alexandrakis and Manos Katrakis. He was a member of Anatoli company during the 1980s. He participated in many publications as a narrator, he was participated even in directing. In October 2009, he became an artistic member of DIPETHE Patras from the public council of the theatre.

Death
Voglis died on 20 April 2016, aged 78, in his native Athens.

Filmography

Film
{| class="wikitable"
! Year !! Film title(English translation) !! Original titleand transliteration
|-
| 1960 || Eroika || Ερόικα
|-
| 1962 || I Yperifanoi || Οι Υπερήφανοι
|-
| 1962 || Pagida || Παγίδα
|-
| 1963 || Petodas me ton Anemo || Πετώντας με τον ΆνεμοFly With the Wind
|-
| 1963 || Stavraetoi || Σταυραετοί
|-
| 1964 || O krahtis || Ο κράχτης
|-
| 1965 || Kataigida || ΚαταιγίδαThunder 
|-
| 1965 || Vromiki poli || Βρώμικη πόληDirty City
|-
| 1965 || To fylachto tis manas || Το φυλαχτό της μάνας
|-
| 1966 || Katigoro tous anthropous || Κατηγορώ τους ανθρώπους
|-
| 1966 || To choma vafthike kokkino || Το χώμα βάφτηκε κόκκινο 
|-
| 1966 || Xehasmeni iroes || Ξεχασμένοι ήρωεςForgotten Heroes
|-
| 1966 || Epicheirisis Doureios Ippos || Επιχείρησις "Δούρειος Ίππος" 
|-
| 1967 || Eriotes sti Lesvo || Έρωτες στη ΛέσβοRomance in Lesbos
|-
| 1968 || Koritsia ston ilio || Κορίτσια στον ήλιο
|-
| 1968 || I andres de liyizoun pote || Οι άνδρες δε λυγίζουν ποτέ
|-
| 1968 || Randevou me mia agnosti || Ραντεβού με μια άγνωστηMeeting with a Dumb Guy
|-
| 1969 || Enas magkas sta salonia || Ένας μάγκας στα σαλόνιαA Gentlemen in the Family Room
|-
| 1969 || O blofatzis || Ο μπλοφατζής
|-
| 1970 || Erotas dichos synora || Έρωτας δίχως σύνορα
|-
| 1970 || O Gennaioi tou Vorra || Οι Γενναίοι του Βορρά
|-
| 1971 || I egoistes || Οι εγωιστέςThe Egoists
|-
| 1972 || Aera! Aera! Aera! || Αέρα! Αέρα! Αέρα!
|-
| 1973 || Orgia se timi efkairias || Όργια σε τιμή ευκαιρίας
|-
| 1973 || O valtos || Ο βάλτος
|-
| 1978 || Kravgi gynaikon || Κραυγή γυναικών
|-
| 1980 || Eleftherios Venizelos || 'Ελευθέριος Βενιζέλος'|-
| 1981 || Panic in the School || Πανικός στα σχολείαPanikos ta sholia|-
| 1984 || Antistrofi metrissi || Αντίστροφη μέτρηση|-
| 1987 || O efialtis || Ο εφιάλτης|-
| 1987 || Glykia patrida || Γλυκιά πατρίδα|-
| 1988 || I goitia tou hrimatos || Η γοητεία του χρήματος|-
| 1989 || Epistrofi ap to htes || Επιστροφή απ' το χτες|-
| 1991 || To meteoro vima tou pelargou || Το μετέωρο βήμα του πελαργού|-
| 2001 || To tama || Το τάμα|-
| 2001 || Beautiful People || -
|-
| 2007 || Poly milas... poly klais || Πολύ μιλάς... πολύ κλαις(you) Talk Too Much... (You) Cry Too Much|}

Television

TheatreI anodos tou Artouri Oui (The Resistible Rise of Arturo Ui)HecubaThe Persians (Πέρσες = Perses)Oedipus RexPhiloctetes (Φιλοκτήτης = Philoktetes)Peer GyntCoriolanusTiger Lillies''

References

External links

1937 births
2016 deaths
Greek male voice actors
Greek male film actors
Male actors from Athens